De Grootste Belg (The Greatest Belgian) was a 2005 vote conducted by Belgian public TV broadcaster Canvas, public radio broadcaster Radio 1, and newspaper De Standaard, to determine who is the Greatest Belgian of all time. It could be considered as a Flemish list, considering that French-speaking community broadcast RTBF also held a vote, Le plus grand Belge.
Nominees needed to have lived between 50 BC and now, between the borders of present-day Belgium. This is because Belgium only gained its independence in 1830, while numerous historical individuals from, for example, the Spanish Netherlands, are considered to be "Belgians".

An initial list of 111 names (100 decided by a panel, 11 added by the public after a preliminary poll) was set online. People could vote for their favourites to reduce the longlist to a shortlist of ten. After the first television show, the final list of ten nominees was announced. Two of them, Ambiorix and Hendrik Conscience, came out of the 11 names chosen by the public instead of the 100 chosen by the panel. The ten finalists were each presented on Canvas with a documentary, their nomination defended by famous Flemish people.

On 1 December 2005, Pater Damiaan was announced as the winner of the "De Grootste Belg" poll, beating Paul Janssen and Eddy Merckx.

Top 10

From 11 to 111

11) Desiderius Erasmus, (1466–1536) writer, philosopher, theologian (In Praise of Folly). Born in Rotterdam or Gouda and thus technically a Dutchman by modern-day standards.
12) Adolphe Sax, (1814–1894) inventor of the saxophone.
13) Jan Decleir, (1946–) theatre, TV and film actor (Mira, Daens, Character, The Memory of a Killer).
14) Kim Clijsters, (1983–) tennis player.
15) Victor Horta, (1861–1947) architect and designer (Hôtel Tassel, Brussels-Central railway station, Centre for Fine Arts, Brussels).
16) Baudouin of Belgium, (1930–1993) king (1950–1993). Founder of the King Baudouin Foundation.
17) Pieter Bruegel the Elder, (1525–1569) painter (The Peasant Wedding, The Blind Leading the Blind, Netherlandish Proverbs, Landscape with the Fall of Icarus).
18) René Magritte, (1898–1967) painter (The Treachery of Images, The Son of Man).
19) Guido Gezelle, (1830–1899) poet (Het Schrijverke, Dien Avond en die Rooze).
20) Toots Thielemans, (1922–2016) jazz musician (Bluesette).
21) Charles V of Spain, (1500–1558) Spanish king (1517–1556) and Holy Roman Emperor (1519–1558), who was born in Ghent.
22) Louis Paul Boon, (1912–1979) novelist (De Kapellekensbaan, Priester Daens, Mieke Maaike's Obscene Jeugd).
23) Jozef Cardijn, (1882–1967) priest, cardinal and humanitarian. Founder of the Young Christian Workers.
24) Hergé, (1907–1983) comics artist (The Adventures of Tintin, Quick and Flupke).
25) James Ensor, (1860–1949) painter (Christ's Entry Into Brussels in 1889).
26) Peter Piot, (1949–) physician. Co-discoverer of the Ebola virus, for which he found a way to contain the epidemic. 
27) Jan van Eyck, painter (Ghent Altarpiece, The Arnolfini Portrait).
28) Christoffel Plantijn, printer and publisher.
29) Willy Vandersteen, (1913–1990) comics artist (Suske en Wiske, De Rode Ridder)
30) Hugo Claus, (1929–2008) novelist, poet, playwright and film director (The Sorrow of Belgium).
31) Jan Frans Willems, (1793–1846) writer and activist. Founder of the Flemish movement.
32) Leo Baekeland, (1863–1944) chemist. Inventor of bakelite.
33) Lieven Gevaert, (1868–1935) businessman. Founder of Gevaert & Co (nowadays Agfa-Gevaert).
34) Arno Hintjens, (1949–2022) rock singer (TC Matic).
35) Mark Uytterhoeven, (1957–) TV presenter and sports journalist (Het Huis van Wantrouwen, Morgen Maandag, Alles Kan Beter).
36) Dirk Martens, (1447–1534) printer.
37) Justine Henin-Hardenne, (1982–) tennis player.
38) Raymond Goethals, (1921–2004) association football player and trainer.
39) Ernest Solvay, (1838–1922) chemist, businessman and philanthropist. Inventor of the ammonia-soda process.
40) Paul-Henri Spaak, (1899–1972) Prime Minister (1938–1939) (1946) (1947–1949). President of the United Nations (1946–1947), Secretary General of N.A.T.O. (1957–1961). President of the European Coal and Steel Community (1952–1954). 
41) Achiel Van Acker, (1898–1975) Prime Minister (1945–1946) (1946) (1954–1958).
42) Marie Popelin, (1846–1913) activist and feminist. Founder of the women's right movement Ligue belge du droit des femmes. First Belgian woman to receive a law doctorate.
43) Paul Delvaux, (1897–1994) painter.
44) Simon Stevin, mathematician. Described the Decimal system for fractions and did mathematical groundwork for the construction of fortifications. Made windmills more efficient. Was the first to explain the tides using the attraction of the moon, discovered the hydrostatic paradox and proved the inclined plane.
45) Julien Lahaut, politician.
46) Christine Van Broeckhoven, (1953–) molecular biologist. Did research on Alzheimer dementia, bipolar mental disorders and other neurological diseases. 
47) Queen Elisabeth, (1876–1965) queen (1909–1934). Established the Queen Elisabeth Medical Foundation and the Queen Elisabeth Competition.
48) Marc Sleen, (1922–2016) comics artist (The Adventures of Nero, Piet Fluwijn en Bolleke, De Lustige Kapoentjes).
49) Willem Elsschot, (1882–1960) novelist and poet (Het Huwelijk, Villa des Roses, Lijmen/Het Been and Kaas).
50) Paul Van Ostaijen, (1896–1928) poet (Boem Paukeslag!, Melopee).
51) Pierre-Théodore Verhaegen, (1796–1862) lawyer and politician. Founder of the Free University of Brussels.
52) Raymond Ceulemans, (1937–) billiards player.
53) Jean-Marie Pfaff, (1953–) association football player.
54) Georges Pire, priest and humanitarian. Nobel Peace Prize, 1958.
55) Isabelle Gatti de Gamond, (1839–1905) activist and feminist. Launched the first systematic courses of secondary female education (Cours d'Éducation pour jeunes filles).
56) Philip the Good, (1396–1467) duke of Burgundy (1419–1467).
57) Adrien de Gerlache de Gomery, (1866–1934) polar explorer. First man to spend a few months on Antarctica.
58) Edward Anseele, (1856–1938) politician.
59) Pascal Vyncke, creator of the website SeniorenNet. His high vote was a result of many people, including himself and his family under a different name, trying to get him into this list.
60) Christian de Duve, (1917–2013) cytologist and biochemist. Did research after the microstructure of cells. Nobel Prize in Physiology or Medicine, 1974.
61) Georges Lemaître, (1894–1966) priest, astronomer, mathematician. Developed the Big Bang theory.
62) Rembert Dodoens, (1517–1585) physician and botanist (Cruydeboeck).
63) John Cockerill, (1790–1840) businessman (John Cockerill)
64) Ilya Prigogine, (1917–2003) physical chemist. Nobel Prize for Chemistry, 1977.
65) Tom Barman, (1972–) rock singer (dEUS).
66) Django Reinhardt, (1910–1953) jazz guitarist (Nuages).
67) Gaston Eyskens, (1905–1988) Prime Minister (1948–1950) (1958–1961) (1968–1973).
68) Anne Teresa De Keersmaeker, (1960–) choreographer (Rosas danst Rosas).
69) Camille Huysmans, (1871–1968) Prime Minister (1946–1947) and activist.
70) Antoon van Dyck, (1599–1641) painter (Charles I at the Hunt, Equestrian Portrait of Charles I).
71) Briek Schotte, (1919–2004) cyclist.
72) Henry Van de Velde, (1863–1957) architect (Bloemenwerf, Boekentoren).
73) Rik Coppens, (1930–2015) association football player.
74) Hadewijch, poet (Book of Visions, Poems in Stanzas).
75) Ingrid Berghmans (1961) judoka
76) Orlandus Lassus, (1530–1594) composer (Lagrime di San Pietro, Prophetiae Sibyllarum).
77) Georges Simenon, (1903–1989) novelist (Inspector Maigret).
78) Rik Van Looy, (1933–) cyclist.
79) Ferdinand Verbiest, (1623–1688) priest, astronomer and mathematician.
80) Dries Van Noten, (1958–) fashion designer.
81) Cyriel Buysse, (1859–1932) novelist and playwright (Het gezin van Paemel).
82) Hans Memling, painter (The Last Judgment, St. Ursula Shrine).
83) Jeanne Brabants, (1920–2014) ballet choreographer. Founder of the Royal Ballet of Flanders.
84) Tom Lanoye, (1958–) novelist (Alles Moet Weg, Kartonnen Dozen, Het Goddelijke Monster).
85) Rik Van Steenbergen, (1927–2003) cyclist.
86) Adolphe Quételet, (1796–1874) astronomer, mathematician, statistician and sociologist. Developed the body mass index scale.
87) Gaston Roelants, (1937–) athlete. Olympic gold medal for 3000 m steeplechase (1964), European Championship 3000 m steeplechase (1962).
88) Jan van Ruusbroec, poet (The Seven Steps of the Ladder of Spiritual Love, The Spiritual Espousals).
89) Paul Van Himst, (1943–) association football player and trainer.
90) Emile Vandervelde, (1866–1938) politician. Minister of Justice (1918–1921) and Minister of Foreign Affairs (1925–1927).
91) Amélie Nothomb, (1966–) novelist (Hygiène de l'assassin).
92) Frans Van Cauwelaert, (1880–1961) politician and activist.
93) Constant Vanden Stock, (1914–2008) association football player and trainer.
94) Gabrielle Petit, (1893–1916), nurse and resistance fighter. 
95) Marc Van Montagu, (1933–) molecular biologist. Co-founder of the Plant Genetic Systems and CropDesign companies. Discovered the Ti plasmid. 
96) Auguste Beernaert, (1829–1912) Prime Minister (1884–1894). Nobel Peace Prize, 1909.
97) Marcel Broodthaers, (1924–1976) artist (Surface of mussels (with bag))).
98) Maurice Maeterlinck, (1862–1949) novelist and playwright (The Blue Bird, Pelléas and Mélisande). Nobel Prize for Literature, 1911.
99) Pedro de Gante, missionary. Beatified in 1988. 
100) Philippe Herreweghe, (1947–) conductor. Founder of the Collegium Vocale Gent and La Chapelle Royale.
101) Rogier van der Weyden, (1400–1464) painter (The Descent from the Cross).
102) Fernand Khnopff, (1858–1921) painter (The Sphinx, or, The Caresses).
103) César Franck, (1822–1890) composer (Grande Pièce Symphonique).
104) Gerard Mortier, (1943–2014) opera director.
105) Pierre Wynants, (1939–) cook.
106) Henri Pirenne, (1862–1935) historian (Histoire de Belgique).
107) Pierre Deligne, (1944–) mathematician. Proved the Weil conjectures.
108) Raoul Servais, (1928–) animator and film director (Harpya).
109) Emile Francqui, (1863–) soldier, diplomat and philanthropist.
110) Charles Rogier, (1800–1885) Prime Minister (1847–1852) (1857–1867).
111) Hugo van der Goes, painter (Portinari Altarpiece).

See also
 Les plus grands Belges, the Walloon version of this contest held around the same time.
 Greatest Britons spin-offs

Notes

Belg, De Grootste
Belgian reality television series
Lists of Belgian people
2005 Belgian television series debuts
2005 Belgian television series endings
Belgian television series based on British television series